Papunahua is a village and Department Corregimiento located in the Vaupés Department, Republic of Colombia.

Corregimientos of Vaupés Department